The Diocese of Huajuapan de León is a Latin Church ecclesiastical territory or diocese of the Catholic Church in Mexico. The diocese is a suffragan in the ecclesiastical province of the metropolitan Archdiocese of Puebla de los Ángeles. It was erected on 25 April 1902 as the "Diocese of Mixtecas" and renamed on 13 November 1903. It cathedra is found within the Catedral de la Virgen de Guadalupe in the episcopal see of Huajuapan de León, Oaxaca.

Bishops

Ordinaries
Rafael Amador y Hernández (1903 -1923) 
Luis María Altamirano y Bulnes (1923 -1933), appointed Bishop of Tulancingo, Hidalgo
Jenaro Méndez del Río (1933 -1952) 
Celestino Fernández y Fernández (1952 -1967) 
José López Lara (1967 -1981), appointed Bishop of San Juan de los Lagos, Jalisco
José de Jesús Aguilera Rodriguez (1982 -1991) 
Felipe Padilla Cardona (1992 -1996), appointed Coadjutor Bishop of Tehuantepec, Oaxaca
Teodoro Enrique Pino Miranda (2000 - 2020)
Miguel Ángel Castro Muñoz (2021 - )

Auxiliary bishop
Celestino Fernández y Fernández (1948-1952), appointed bishop here

External links and references

Huajuapan de Leon
Huajuapan de Leon, Roman Catholic Diocese of
Huajuapan de Leon
Huajuapan de Leon
Oaxaca